Tapan is a village in Tapan CD Block in Balurghat subdivision of Dakshin Dinajpur district in the state of West Bengal, India.

Geography

Location

In the map alongside, all places marked on the map are linked in the full screen version.

Police station
Tapan police station under West Bengal police has jurisdiction over Tapan CD Block.

CD Block HQ
The headquarters of Tapan CD Block is at Tapan.

Demographics
As per the 2011 Census of India, Tapan had a total population of 2,796, of which 1,451 (52%) were males and 1,345 (48%) were females. Population below 6 years was 256. The total number of literates in Tapan was 2,105 (82.87% of the population over 6 years).

Education
Nathaniyal Murmu Memorial College was established at Tapan in 2011. Affiliated to the Gour Banga University, it offers honours courses in English, Bengali, history and education, and a general course in arts.

Healthcare
Tapan Rural Hospital at Tapan (with 30 beds) is the main medical facility in Tapan CD Block. There are primary health centres at Monahali (with 10 beds),  Chenchra (Rampara (Chenchra) PHC) (with 10 beds) and Balapur (Malancha PHC) (with 10 beds).

References

Villages in Dakshin Dinajpur district